Mercedes-Benz 200T may refer to one of two automobiles:

 A variant of the Mercedes-Benz W123
 A variant of the Mercedes-Benz W124

200T